Danny Roew is an American music video and film director.

Filmography

Music videos
 "Destiny," Chakra (2003)
 "Happy," Ryan Oliver (2004)
 "It Isn't Me," Society 1 (2005)
 "Where Will You Go," Detroit Mutant Radio (2006)
 "The Abrasive," Twin Method (2006)
 "This Is The End," Society 1 (2006)
 "We R In Need of A Musical Revolution," Esthero (2006)
 "Just One Kiss", Nick Carter (2010/2011)
 "Burning Up", Nick Carter featuring Britton "Briddy" Shaw (2011)

Documentaries
 Diary of a Filmmaker: Havoc (Producer) (2001)
 Tha Westside (Producer) (2006)
 Within the Cavern (2006)
 Caverns of the Mojave: An Expedition with Real Cavers (2006)

Short films
 Lost Thoughts (2000)
 Be Your Own Boss (2001)
 Dog Lovers (2008)

Feature films
Shotgun Wedding (2013)

Television films
Dead 7 | Syfy (2016)

External links
 
 
 Danny Roew's official website

American music video directors
People from Wichita, Kansas
Living people
Film directors from Kansas
Year of birth missing (living people)